Diego Novoa (born 31 May 1989) is a Colombian professional footballer who plays as a goalkeeper for La Equidad in the Colombian Categoría Primera A.

International career 
Novoa was named in the provisional  Colombia squad for the 2019 Copa America.

References

1989 births
Living people
Colombian footballers
Association football goalkeepers
La Equidad footballers